Hulmeville is a borough in Bucks County, Pennsylvania. The population was 1,003 at the 2010 census.

History
The Hulme family name, originally DeHoulme, is of Norman origin, dating from William the Conqueror. Members of the family originally settled in Lancashire, England, a branch later moved to Cheshire. The American family came from this branch. George Hulme Sr. and George Hulme Jr. immigrated to Bucks County from Tilston, Cheshire about 1700, purchasing land and settled in Middletown Township, some of the family later relocating to Buckingham. John Hulme Sr., grandson of George Sr. and his son, George Hulme Jr., moved from Buckingham to Fallsington and ran a weaving business until 1796 when John Jr. purchased land along the Neshaminy Creek and called it Milford. John Jr. married Rebecca Milnor daughter of William Milnor.

Within a few years, the village built up to a number of dwellings, mills and other shops. The five sons of John Jr. became a miller, two storekeepers, a tanner and a farmer. There was no public house, but John Jr. many times opened his house to travelers. One autumn day in 1809, Josiah Quincy III stayed overnight on the way from Boston to Washington, D.C. John Jr. served a term in the Pennsylvania General Assembly and helped start a post office at Milford established on 1 October 1809, his son Isaac, the first postmaster. The village name then changed to Hulmeville. It is claimed that the General Assembly changed the name in honor of John Jr.

The first bank in Bucks County was organized in 1814, John Jr. the first president. The bank moved to Bristol in 1830 and its name was changed to Farmers' National Bank.

The Hulmeville Historic District was added to the National Register of Historic Places in 1986.

Geography
Hulmeville is located at  (40.143259, -74.907118).

Neshaminy Creek passes through Hulmeville.

Demographics

As of the 2010 census, the borough was 93.5% Non-Hispanic White, 0.7% Black or African American, 3.0% Asian, and 2.4% were two or more races. 1.0% of the population were of Hispanic or Latino ancestry.

As of the census of 2000, there were 893 people, 339 households, and 233 families residing in the borough. The population density was 2,319.3 people per square mile (884.1/km²). There were 356 housing units at an average density of 924.6 per square mile (352.4/km²). The racial makeup of the borough was 97.42% White, 0.34% African American, 0.45% Native American, 1.01% Asian, 0.11% from other races, and 0.67% from two or more races. Hispanic or Latino of any race were 0.45% of the population.

There were 339 households, out of which 30.4% had children under the age of 18 living with them, 57.2% were married couples living together, 9.4% had a female householder with no husband present, and 31.0% were non-families. 23.0% of all households were made up of individuals, and 6.2% had someone living alone who was 65 years of age or older. The average household size was 2.63 and the average family size was 3.17.

In the borough the population was spread out, with 23.7% under the age of 18, 6.6% from 18 to 24, 35.1% from 25 to 44, 22.8% from 45 to 64, and 11.8% who were 65 years of age or older. The median age was 35 years. For every 100 females there were 99.3 males. For every 100 females age 18 and over, there were 103.9 males.

The median income for a household in the borough was $55,259, and the median income for a family was $59,000. Males had a median income of $42,321 versus $31,923 for females. The per capita income for the borough was $24,153. About 0.8% of families and 1.8% of the population were below the poverty line, including 1.4% of those under age 18 and none of those age 65 or over.

Education

Hulmeville lies within the Neshaminy School District. Students attend Herbert Hoover Elementary School for grades K-4, Maple Point Middle School for grades 5-8, and Neshaminy High School for grades 9-12.

Transportation

Pennsylvania Route 513 is the only numbered highway traversing Hulmeville. It follows a north-south alignment via Hulmeville Road and Bellevue Avenue across the western portion of the borough.

SEPTA provides Suburban Bus service to Hulmeville along Route 130, which runs between Frankford Avenue and Knights Road in Northeast Philadelphia and Bucks County Community College in Newtown.

Climate

According to the Köppen climate classification system, Hulmeville has a Humid subtropical climate (Cfa). Cfa climates are characterized by all months having an average mean temperature > , at least four months with an average mean temperature ≥ , at least one month with an average mean temperature ≥  and no significant precipitation difference between seasons. Although most summer days are slightly humid in Hulmeville, episodes of heat and high humidity can occur with heat index values > . The average wettest month is July, which corresponds with the annual peak in thunderstorm activity. Episodes of extreme cold and wind can occur, with wind chill values < . Ice storms and large snowstorms depositing ≥ 12 inches (30 cm) occur once every few years, particularly during nor’easters from December through February.

Ecology

According to the A. W. Kuchler U.S. potential natural vegetation types, Hulmeville would have a dominant vegetation type of Appalachian Oak (104) with a dominant vegetation form of Eastern Hardwood Forest (25). The spring bloom typically begins by April 7 and fall color usually peaks by November 4.

References

External links

Populated places established in 1796
Boroughs in Bucks County, Pennsylvania
1795 establishments in Pennsylvania